Song Jin-woo (Hangul: 송진우, Hanja: 宋津宇; born February 16, 1966) is a retired South Korean left-handed pitcher who played for the Hanwha Eagles his entire career. He currently holds several pitching records for the KBO, including his 210 wins, 2048 strikeouts, and 3003 innings pitched. He is the only pitcher in KBO League history to win 200 games, and the only one to strike out 2,000 or more batters. Because of his central role in establishing the Korean baseball players' association (essentially a players' union), he has the nickname of "Mr. President."

Song attended Dongguk University. He competed for South Korea in the 1988 Summer Olympics, and at the 2000 Summer Olympics, on the team that won the bronze medal. 

On May 18, 2000, Song no-hit the Haitai Tigers (winning the game 6-0), becoming only the tenth KBO pitcher to accomplish that feat.

Song won the 2002 KBO League Golden Glove Award with a record of 18-7, a 2.99 ERA, 165 strikeouts, and 8 complete games.

Song was the first pitcher in the KBO to strike out over 2,000 batters. He accomplished this feat on June 6, 2008, at his home field of Daejeon Baseball Stadium against the Woori Heroes. He recorded the strikeout in the bottom of the 8th inning with two outs, ringing up Song Ji-man.

Song's number 21 jersey was retired by the Eagles on September 23, 2009.

Coaching career 
Song became the Eagles' pitching coach in 2018, vowing to change the team's approach. Song said, "Changing the entry is the most sensitive issue between coaches and players." Song's "personalized' prescription" played a big role. Foreign pitcher Keyvius Sampson had difficulty in the early stages of the season, but he improved his position as well as his arrest while correcting his position. [Song] told Jason Wheeler to fix the changeup. Song coach also emphasized "communication."

Filmography

Television show

See also 
 List of KBO career win leaders
 List of KBO career saves leaders
 List of KBO career strikeout leaders

References

External links 

 Career statistics and player information from the KBO official website
 Databaseolympics

1966 births
Living people
Sportspeople from North Chungcheong Province
Dongguk University alumni
South Korean baseball players
KBO League pitchers
Hanwha Eagles players
Hanwha Eagles coaches
Baseball players at the 2000 Summer Olympics
Baseball players at the 1988 Summer Olympics
Olympic baseball players of South Korea
Olympic bronze medalists for South Korea
Olympic medalists in baseball
Asian Games medalists in baseball
South Korean baseball coaches
Baseball players with retired numbers
Baseball players at the 2002 Asian Games
Medalists at the 2000 Summer Olympics
Asian Games gold medalists for South Korea
Medalists at the 2002 Asian Games
South Korean Buddhists